The following lists events that happened during 1948 in Australia.

Incumbents

Monarch – George VI
Governor General – William McKell
Prime Minister – Ben Chifley
Chief Justice – Sir John Latham

State Premiers
Premier of New South Wales – James McGirr
Premier of Queensland – Ned Hanlon
Premier of South Australia – Thomas Playford IV
Premier of Tasmania – Edward Brooker (until 25 February), then Robert Cosgrove
Premier of Victoria – Thomas Hollway
Premier of Western Australia – Ross McLarty

State Governors
Governor of New South Wales – Sir John Northcott
Governor of Queensland – Sir John Lavarack
Governor of South Australia – Sir Charles Norrie
Governor of Tasmania – Sir Hugh Binney
Governor of Victoria – Sir Winston Dugan
Governor of Western Australia – Sir James Mitchell (from 5 October)

Events

 23 January – De Havilland Australia conducts the first flight of its 3 engined Drover transport aircraft at Bankstown Airport.
 19 February – An Avro Lincoln bomber crashes at RAAF Base Amberley in Queensland, killing 16 Royal Australian Air Force personnel.
 25 February – Robert Cosgrove is reinstated as Premier of Tasmania after being cleared of corruption charges on 22 February.
 8 May – Margaret McIntyre becomes the first woman elected to the Parliament of Tasmania. She is killed in a plane crash later in the year.
 29 May – A federal referendum is held, asking one question on Rents and Prices. It is not carried.
 1 July – The Pharmaceutical Benefits Scheme is introduced.
 21 August – A state election is held in Tasmania. The result is a hung parliament, but Robert Cosgrove and Labor retain power with the support of an independent, William Wedd.
 2 September – The Douglas DC-3 Lutana crashes near Nundle, New South Wales, killing all 13 on board.
 21 September – H.V. Evatt becomes President of the United Nations General Assembly.
 29 November – The first Holden car, the model 48-215, popularly known as the FX, rolls off the assembly line. The on-road cost was approximately £760.
 1 December – The body of an unidentified man is found on a beach in Adelaide, becoming known as the Somerton Man.
 16 December – HMAS Sydney is commissioned into the Royal Australian Navy as its first aircraft carrier.

Arts and literature

 William Dobell wins the Archibald Prize with his portrait of Margaret Olley

One of the few Australian songs to top the Australian charts "Good-Night Mister Moon" by Allan Ryan and William Flynn

Sport
 18 September – Minor premiers Western Suburbs win the 1948 NSWRFL season, claiming their first premiership since 1934 after defeating Balmain 8–5. North Sydney finish in last place, claiming the wooden spoon.
 Morna takes line honours and Westward wins on handicap in the Sydney to Hobart Yacht Race
 Rimfire wins the Melbourne Cup

Births
 5 January – Wally Foreman, football commentator (died 2006)
 23 January – Glenn Wheatley, musician and talent manager (died 2022)
 25 January – Ros Kelly, politician
 10 February – Mike Pratt, politician
 2 March – Jeff Kennett, Premier of Victoria (1992–1999)
 13 March – Rick Amor, artist
 19 March – Vince Lovegrove, singer, journalist and band manager (died 2012)
 27 March – Rosemary Follett, Chief Minister of the Australian Capital Territory (1989, 1991–1995)
 31 March – Graham Cornes, Australian rules footballer
 2 April – Jennifer Rowe, children's author
 29 April – Leslie Howard, musician
 15 May – Muriel Porter, Anglican laywoman
 28 May – Michael Field, Premier of Tasmania (1989–1992)
 11 June – Pat Wilson, singer and journalist
 21 June – Lionel Rose, boxer (died 2011)
 30 June – Galarrwuy Yunupingu, Aboriginal leader
 15 July – Richard Franklin, film director (died 2007)
 24 July – Joan London, writer
 7 August – Greg Chappell, cricketer
 18 August – Richard Tracey, Australian military and civil judge and barrister (died 2019)
 19 August – Robert Hughes, actor
 20 August – John Noble, actor
 12 September – Max Walker, cricketer and VFL footballer (died 2016)
 18 September – Christopher Skase, fugitive businessman (died 2001)
 22 September – Denis Burke, Chief Minister of the Northern Territory (1999–2001)
 25 September – Vicki Viidikas, poet (died 1998)
 26 September – Olivia Newton-John, entertainer (died 2022)
 3 October – Rob Langer, cricketer
 4 October – Bob Morris, racing driver
 5 October – Jim Waley, journalist
 8 October – Warren Truss, leader of the National Party
 19 October – Meg Lees, Democrat senator for South Australia
 30 October – Garry McDonald, actor
 5 November – Malcolm Milne, Olympic skier
 6 November – Geoff Prosser, politician
 14 November – Ian Stanley, golfer (died 2018)
 15 November – James Kemsley, cartoonist (died 2007)
 22 November – Gary Dempsey, Australian rules footballer
 1 December – John Quigley, WA politician
 2 December – Patricia Hewitt, British Labour Party politician
 5 December – Cheryl Kernot, politician
 12 December – Kim Beazley, politician
 15 December – Cassandra Harris, actor (died 1991)
 29 December – Michael White, psychotherapist (died 2008)

Deaths

 12 February – Sir Isaac Isaacs, 9th Governor-General of Australia and 3rd Chief Justice of Australia (b. 1855)
 23 March – Lou Cunningham, New South Wales politician (b. 1889)
 24 March – Sydney Sampson, Victorian politician and newspaper proprietor (b. 1863)
 9 April – George Carpenter, 5th General of The Salvation Army (b. 1872)
 15 April – Eric Fairweather Harrison, Victorian politician and soldier (b. 1880)
 20 May – Marie Pitt, poet and journalist (b. 1869)
 8 June – Thomas Crawford, Queensland politician (b. 1865)
 18 June – Edward Brooker, 31st Premier of Tasmania (born in the United Kingdom) (b. 1891)
 18 July – May Moss, welfare worker and suffragette (b. 1869)
 21 July – Francis Joseph Bayldon, master mariner and nautical instructor (born in the United Kingdom) (b. 1872)
 24 July – Stanley Goble, 2nd Chief of the Air Staff (b. 1891)
 31 July – Nigel Barker, Olympic track and field athlete (b. 1883)
 28 August – Jack Lumsdaine, singer, songwriter and soldier (b. 1895)
 2 September – Margaret McIntyre, Tasmanian politician (b. 1886)
 9 September – Frank Foster, New South Wales politician (b. 1872)
 18 October
 George Cann, New South Wales politician (born in the United Kingdom) (b. 1871)
 Philip Collier, 14th Premier of Western Australia (b. 1873)
 8 December – Matthew Charlton, 7th Federal Leader of the Opposition (b. 1866)

See also
 List of Australian films of the 1940s

References

 
Australia
Years of the 20th century in Australia